The Old Boys' Network: A Headmaster's Diaries 1970–1986 is the 2009 autobiography by the late headmaster of Westminster School, John Rae. It consists of the journal he kept for most of the period in which he was headmaster of Westminster School (1972– 1986), edited by him shortly before his death in December 2006, aged 75. It was published by Short Books on 2 April 2009. It was serialised as BBC Radio 4's Book of the Week from 30 March to 3 April 2009, read by Tim Pigott-Smith.

See also 
Westminster School
John Rae

References 

2009 non-fiction books
Westminster School